The following lists events that happened during 2014 in Ethiopia.

Incumbents
President: Mulatu Teshome
Prime Minister: Hailemariam Desalegn

Events

February
 February 17 - Ethiopian Airlines Flight 702 between Addis Ababa and Rome is diverted to land at Geneva in an attempted hijacking by the co-pilot who claims to be seeking political asylum.

April
 April 16 - Gunmen ambush a bus killing nine people and wounding six others in western Ethiopia near the Sudanese border.

May
 May 2 - At least nine students are killed in protests in Oromia Region.

November
 November 4 - In Johannesburg, Angolan journalist and human rights campaigner Rafael Marques says the African Union should move its headquarters out of Ethiopia because of concerns about freedom of expression there.

December
 December 6 - At least 70 drown when a migrant boat from Ethiopia sinks off the Red Sea coast of Yemen.

References

 
2010s in Ethiopia
Ethiopia
Ethiopia
Years of the 21st century in Ethiopia